"Under the Thumb" is the third single from English singer Amy Studt's debut album, False Smiles (2003). Released on 29 September 2003, the song reached number 10 on the UK Singles Chart and number 36 in Ireland.

Music video
The video tells the story of a young woman who has got her boyfriend (Iddo Goldberg) on a 'short leash'. In the beginning she is seen carrying shopping walking along a country road. She goes into her cottage and her boyfriend is tied up to a chair. At various stages in the video she is seen doing things for him like feeding him and washing his hair. There are newspaper articles around the house with their pictures in and they are on the TV, which makes out they are missing. The police come knocking on the door but think no-one is there and leave. Then Amy starts destroying her room, and in the end she lets her boyfriend leave the house, and she locks the door behind her.

Track listings
UK and Australian CD single
 "Under the Thumb" – 3:44
 "False Smiles" – 3:52
 "Rose" – 4:27
 "Under the Thumb" (video)

UK cassette single
 "Under the Thumb" – 3:44
 "False Smiles" – 3:52
 "Rose" – 4:27

Charts

Release history

References

External links
 "Under the Thumb" music video

Amy Studt songs
19 Recordings singles
2003 singles
2003 songs
Polydor Records singles
Songs written by Amy Studt
Songs written by David Eriksen
Songs written by Karen Poole